Brightwood College, formerly Kaplan College, was a system of for-profit colleges in the United States, owned and operated by Education Corporation of America. Main qualifications offered included health, business, criminal justice, information technology, nursing and professional training (trades) programs.
On December 5, 2018, Brightwood's parent company, Education Corporation of America, announced unexpectedly via an email that all of its schools would be closing in two business days. Staff were terminated without legally required notice.

History
Before being acquired by Education Corporation of America (ECA) in September 2015, Kaplan College was part of Kaplan Higher Education, a subsidiary of Kaplan, Inc.

Kaplan, Inc., purchased the American Institute of Commerce, a business training school founded in 1937, and renamed it Kaplan College in 2000, later renaming it to Kaplan University in 2004.

In 2000, Kaplan acquired Quest Education Corporation, which served 30 schools in 11 states. Quest Education Corporation was renamed Kaplan Higher Education in 2002.

In April 2004, Kaplan Higher Education owned 64 campuses, including Hesser College in New Hampshire, and CEI College in California.

California locations operated under the Maric College brand from 2004-2008, then as Kaplan College. In June 2008, Las Vegas-based Heritage College was folded into the Kaplan College brand. In 2010, the Texas schools acquired as part of the Quest purchase were renamed Kaplan College.

In October 2015, Kaplan College's Dayton, Ohio, campus was renamed Brightwood College. The remaining Kaplan College locations became Brightwood College in February–March 2016.

On December 5, 2018, it was announced that Education Corporation of America was shutting down all Brightwood College locations nationwide, due to loss of accreditation from the US Department of Education.

Campuses

Bakersfield, California (closed as of Friday 12/7/18)
Chula Vista, California
Fresno, California
Modesto, California
Los Angeles (Van Nuys), California (founded in 1982 as Modern Technology College)
Palm Springs, California (founded in 2004 as Maric College)
Riverside, California (founded in 1990 as Computer Education Institute)
Sacramento, California
San Diego, California (founded in 1976 as Maric College)
Vista, California
Hammond, Indiana
Indianapolis, Indiana
Baltimore, Maryland
Beltsville, Maryland
Towson, Maryland
Las Vegas, Nevada (founded in 1990 as Professional Careers, Inc., later Heritage College)
Charlotte, North Carolina
Dayton, Ohio (Closed as of 12/7/2018)
Nashville, Tennessee
Arlington, Texas
Beaumont, Texas
Brownsville, Texas
Corpus Christi, Texas
Dallas, Texas
El Paso, Texas
Fort Worth, Texas
Friendswood, Texas
Houston, Texas
Laredo, Texas
McAllen, Texas
San Antonio, Texas (two locations)

Accreditation

Brightwood College is accredited by the Accrediting Council for Independent Colleges and Schools (ACICS). On December 12, 2016, ACICS was derecognized by the U.S. Department of Education. April 2018, this action was under review, following a court ruling remanding the December 2016 decision to current Secretary of Education, Betsy DeVos. Accreditation was finally lost December 2018.

Criticisms

Alleged improper recruiting
Kaplan College, while a part of Kaplan Inc, was one of 15 for-profit colleges cited by the Government Accountability Office (GAO) for deceptive or questionable statements that were made to undercover investigators posing as applicants. The Pembroke Pines, Florida and Riverside, California campuses were both cited in the GAO report. Andrew S. Rosen, President of Kaplan, Inc., described the tactics as "sickening" and promised to eliminate such conduct from Kaplan.  On November 30, 2010, the GAO issued a revised report with several significant edits, altering key passages and softening several of the initial allegations. However it stood by its finding that the college had encouraged fraud and misled potential applicants. Five years later, Kaplan College was sold to Education Corp. and renamed Brightwood.

References

External links
Official website

Former for-profit universities and colleges in the United States
Educational institutions established in 1937
Educational institutions disestablished in 2018
1937 establishments in the United States